The Gatesville Bridge spans the Pearl River between Copiah County, Mississippi and Simpson County, Mississippi.  It was listed on the National Register of Historic Places in 1988.

It brings a county road across the river, east of Gatesville, Mississippi.  It has a Pennsylvania truss span and a Warren pony truss span.  The bridge was built by the Converse Bridge Co. in 1908.

References

Road bridges on the National Register of Historic Places in Mississippi
Pennsylvania truss bridges		
National Register of Historic Places in Copiah County, Mississippi
National Register of Historic Places in Simpson County, Mississippi
Bridges completed in 1908
Pearl River (Mississippi–Louisiana)